The 2019 Four Days of Dunkirk (French: Quatre Jours de Dunkerque 2019) was the 65th edition of the Four Days of Dunkirk cycling stage race. It started on 14 May in Dunkirk and ended on 19 May again in Dunkirk.

Teams
The start list includes 18 teams (4 UCI WorldTeams, 12 Professional Continental Teams, and 2 Continental Teams).

Route

Stages

Stage 1
14 May 2019 — Dunkirk to Condé-sur-l'Escaut,

Stage 2
15 May 2019 — Wallers to Saint-Quentin, 

Clément Venturini from AG2R La Mondiale crossed the line first, but was relegated by the jury due to an "irregular sprint" in the finale, therefore Dylan Groenewegen, who crossed the line second, is the winner of the stage.

Stage 3
16 May 2019 — Laon to Compiègne, 

Clément Venturini from AG2R La Mondiale crossed the line fourth, but was again relegated by the jury due to an "irregular sprint" in the finale, therefore taking 16th place.

Stage 4
17 May 2019 — Fort-Mahon-Plage to Le Portel,

Stage 5
18 May 2019 — Gravelines to Cassel, Nord,

Stage 6
19 May 2019 — Roubaix to Dunkirk,

Classification leadership table

References

External links 
Official site

Four Days of Dunkirk
Four Days of Dunkirk
Four Days of Dunkirk